Shim Ji-ho (born May 2, 1981) is a South Korean actor. He began his entertainment career as a model, then turned to acting. He has starred in television dramas such as School 2 (1999), My Lovely Family (2004), Our Stance on How to Treat a Break-up (2005) and Color of Women (2011), as well as Park Chul-soo's erotic film Green Chair which premiered at the 2005 Sundance Film Festival.

Filmography

Film

Television series

Variety show

Discography

Awards and nominations

References

External links 
  
 Shim Ji-ho Fan Cafe at Daum 
 
 
 

1981 births
Living people
South Korean male television actors
South Korean male film actors
Sejong University alumni